Events from the year 1909 in France.

Incumbents
President: Armand Fallières 
President of the Council of Ministers: Georges Clemenceau (until 24 July), Aristide Briand (starting 24 July)

Events
20 February - The Futurist Manifesto, written by Italian Filippo Marinetti, is published in Le Figaro.
 2 February - The Paris Film Congress opens. It is an attempt to form a cartel of leading European producers similar to that of the MPPC in the United States
18 April - Joan of Arc is beatified in Rome.
25 July - Louis Bleriot is the first man to fly across the English Channel in a heavier-than-air craft.
30 July – Société Française de teintures inoffersires, as predecessor of L'Oréal was founded.
22 September - Three of the Chauffeurs de la Drome are executed by guillotine in Valence, Drôme in south-west France. They were a gang responsible for a three-year campaign of theft, torture and murder in the department of Drôme.

Sport
5 July - Tour de France begins.
1 August - Tour de France ends, won by François Faber of Luxembourg.

Births

January to March
3 February
André Cayatte, filmmaker (died 1989)
Simone Weil, philosopher and social activist (died 1943)
10 February - Henri Alekan, cinematographer (died 2001)
26 February
Claude Cahen, orientalist (died 1991)
Michel Tapié, artist, critic, curator and art collector (died 1987)
7 March - Léo Malet, novelist (died 1996)
14 March
Pierre Cloarec, cyclist (died 1994)
André Pieyre de Mandiargues, writer (died 1991)
27 March - Raymond Oliver, chef and restaurateur (died 1990)
31 March - Robert Brasillach, author, executed for collaboration (died 1945)

April to June
7 April - Robert Charroux, writer (died 1978)
17 April - Alain Poher, politician (died 1996)
22 April - André Girard, civil servant and Resistance worker (died 1993)
11 May - René Bousquet, civil servant, served as secretary general of the Vichy regime police (died 1993)
21 May - Guy de Rothschild, banker (died 2007)
15 June - Pierre La Mure, author (died 1976)
17 June - Régine Pernoud, historian and medievalist (died 1998)
19 June - Robert Défossé, soccer player (died 1973)

July to September
6 July - Jean Taris, swimmer and Olympic medallist (died 1977)
8 July - Louis Finot, international soccer player (died 1996)
13 July - Marie-Thérèse Walter, mistress of Pablo Picasso (died 1977)
15 July - Jean Hamburger, physician, surgeon and essayist (died 1992)
26 July - Bernard Cornut-Gentille, administrator and politician (died 1992)
5 August - Pierre Guillaumat, politician and Minister (died 1991)
11 August - Gaston Litaize, organist and composer (died 1991)
25 September - Marc-Gilbert Sauvajon, film director, script-writer, playwright and author (died 1985)
27 September - Pascal Themanlys, poet, Zionist and Kabbalist (died 2000)
29 September - Jules Merviel, cyclist (died 1976)
September - Henri Déricourt, pilot and accused double agent (died 1962)

October to December
1 October - Thierry Maulnier, journalist, essayist, dramatist and literary critic (died 1988)
11 October - François Tanguy-Prigent, politician and resistance fighter (died 1970)
28 October - Claude Bourdet, writer, journalist and politician (died 1996)
5 November - Pierre Repp, humorist and actor (died 1986)
8 November - Marie-Madeleine Fourcade, French Resistance leader (born 1989)
29 November - Jean Leguay, civil servant, accomplice in the deportation of Jews from France (died 1989)
2 December - Pierre Langlais, military officer (died 1986)

Full date unknown
Marcel Barral, poet (died 1997)

Deaths
18 March - Cécile Bruyère, abbess (born 1845)
28 May - Désiré-Magloire Bourneville, neurologist (born 1840)

References

1900s in France